This is a list of the most famous tourist destinations of Sardinia. Minor islands are included from Olbia, clockwise — industrial sites are not included.

Main towns
Cagliari
Sassari
Olbia
Iglesias
Carbonia
Tempio
Alghero
Nuoro
Oristano
Porto Torres

Other locations

See also
List of archaeological and artistic sites of Sardinia
Sardinia
Sardinian towns

External links
Official promotional website of Sardinia

 
Tourism in Italy
Sardinia
Tourist attractions